Center Township is one of the fourteen townships of Mercer County, Ohio, United States.  The 2000 census found 1,082 people in the township.

Geography
Located in the northeastern part of the county, it borders the following townships:
Union Township - north
Salem Township, Auglaize County - northeast
Noble Township, Auglaize County - southeast
Jefferson Township - south
Hopewell Township - west
Dublin Township - northwest corner

A small part of the city of Celina, the county seat of Mercer County, is located in southern Center Township.

Name and history
Center Township was organized in 1834. It is one of nine Center Townships statewide.

Government
The township is governed by a three-member board of trustees, who are elected in November of odd-numbered years to a four-year term beginning on the following January 1. Two are elected in the year after the presidential election and one is elected in the year before it. There is also an elected township fiscal officer, who serves a four-year term beginning on April 1 of the year after the election, which is held in November of the year before the presidential election. Vacancies in the fiscal officership or on the board of trustees are filled by the remaining trustees.

References

External links
County website

Townships in Mercer County, Ohio
Townships in Ohio